Micky Fernandes (born 20 August 1983) is a retired Indian footballer who played as a midfielder, and is the current manager of Goa Professional League side Vasco SC.

Career
Fernandes started his professional career with Salgaocar of the National Football League in 2003 and stayed at the club till 2007. From Salgaocar, Fernandes joined Sporting Clube de Goa where he stayed till 2009. From there he joined Mohun Bagan where he only stayed at for one season before joining Dempo S.C. in 2010 on a two-year contract.

Mumbai
After spending two years at Dempo in which Fernandes was used as a player in the Goa Professional League only and in three AFC Cup matches in 2011, Fernandes signed for Mumbai F.C. of the I-League on 7 June 2012.

Air India
Fernandes made his debut for Air India F.C. on 20 September 2012 during a Federation Cup match against Mohammedan at the Kanchenjunga Stadium in Siliguri, West Bengal in which he started the match; Air India lost the match 0–1.

Churchill Brothers
Fernandes made his debut for Churchill Brothers in the I-League on 21 September 2013 against Salgaocar at the Duler Stadium in which he came on as a substitute for Alesh Sawant in the 65th minute; as Churchill Brothers lost the match 1–0.

International
Fernandes has played one game for the India national football team in 2006.

Coaching career

Vasco
Mickey Fernandes was appointed as head coach of Vasco S.C. on 2 August 2018.

Career statistics

Club
Statistics accurate as of 02 August 2018

References

1983 births
Living people
Footballers from Goa
I-League players
Sporting Clube de Goa players
Salgaocar FC players
Mohun Bagan AC players
Dempo SC players
Air India FC players
Churchill Brothers FC Goa players
Association football midfielders
Indian footballers
India international footballers